Tang Dengjie (born June 1964) is a Chinese politician and business executive, serving since February 2022 as Minister of Civil Affairs of the People's Republic of China. Previously he served as deputy minister in charge of the National Development and Reform Commission and before that, governor of Fujian and director of the China National Space Administration. He spent much of his career in Shanghai, especially in the automobile industry. He has also served as the chief executive of the state-owned China South Industries Group and head of the China National Space Administration.

Biography
Tang was born in Shanghai, and traces his ancestry to Jianhu County in Jiangsu province. He studied in Mechanical Engineering of Tongji University beginning in September 1981. After graduating, he worked at Shanghai Volkswagen as a technician, Director of its Industrial Engineering Branch, and Manager of Planning and Development. Later he was appointed as the manager of Shanghai ZF Steering Co., Ltd. and Vice President of Shanghai Automotive Industry Corporation. In 2001, he was appointed as the Chairman of Shanghai Electric.

In 2003, Tang was appointed as the Deputy Mayor of Shanghai, who was responsible for industry, agricultural, commercial, tourism, power production, and safe production. He was the youngest Deputy Mayor of Shanghai, and dubbed a “political star” with Lu Hao, who was appointed as the Deputy Mayor of Beijing at aged 35 in the same year. In 2008, he was re-elected as the Deputy Mayor, who was responsible for foreign affairs, foreign trade and economic cooperation, foreign investment, Hong Kong, Macao affairs, ethnic and religious affairs, and Overseas Chinese affairs.

In 2011, he was appointed as the General Manager of China South Industries Group, and President since 2013. In 2017, Tang was named the Vice Minister of the Ministry of Industry and Information Technology, Administrator of China National Space Administration, Chairman of China Atomic Energy Authority, and Director of the State Administration for Science, Technology and Industry for National Defence.

In December 2017, Tang was appointed as the deputy party chief of Fujian, and he was appointed as the Governor in January 2018. On 2 July 2020, he was appointed as deputy secretary of the party group of the National Development and Reform Commission; he also served as one of the deputy ministers in charge of the National Development and Reform Commission. On 28 February 2022, he became minister of Civil Affairs, succeeding Li Jiheng.

Tang is an alternate member of the 19th Central Committee of the Communist Party of China.

References

External links
Profile

1964 births
Living people
Tongji University alumni
People's Republic of China politicians from Shanghai
Chinese Communist Party politicians from Shanghai
Governors of Fujian
Alternate members of the 19th Central Committee of the Chinese Communist Party
Delegates to the 13th National People's Congress
Members of the 12th Chinese People's Political Consultative Conference
China National Space Administration people
Volkswagen Group people
SAIC Motor people